Lechenaultia  macrantha, commonly known as wreath leschenaultia, is a species of flowering plant in the family Goodeniaceae and is endemic to inland areas of south-western Western Australia. It is a low-lying, wreath-like herb or subshrub with narrow, rather fleshy leaves, and yellow petals with deep pink or red wings.

Description
The upper petal lobes are erect, the lower lobes spreading.

Taxonomy
Lechenaultia macrantha was first formally described in 1912 by Kurt Krause in Adolf Engler's journal Das Pflanzenreich from material collected by Max Koch near Wubin in 1905. The specific epithet (macrantha) means "large-flowered".

Distribution and habitat
Wreath lechenaultia grows in open areas in sandy or gravelly soil between Tallering Peak on Tallering Station and Coorow, and near Nerren Nerren Station near Kalbarri and Boolardy Station, in the Avon Wheatbelt, Geraldton Sandplains, Murchison and Yalgoo biogeographic regions of inland south-western Western Australia.

Conservation status
This lechenaultia is listed as "not threatened" by the Government of Western Australia Department of Biodiversity, Conservation and Attractions.

Use in horticulture
Lechenaultia macrantha is not well-known in cultivation and is difficult to maintain for more than a couple of years. It is readily propagated from cuttings and may be grown in a well-drained pot.

References

Asterales of Australia
macrantha
Eudicots of Western Australia
Plants described in 1912